The following is a list of squads for each nation that competed at Euro 1992 in Sweden.

Each nation had to submit a squad of 20 players, by 31 May 1992. Denmark were given until 4 June to enter their final squad, having only been invited to play in the tournament on 30 May 1992, following the suspension of Yugoslavia from sporting competitions.

The players' age, caps and clubs are as of 9 June 1992 (the tournament started on 10 June).

Group A

Denmark
Manager: Richard Møller Nielsen

England
Manager: Graham Taylor

France
Manager: Michel Platini

Sweden
Manager: Tommy Svensson

Group B

CIS
Manager: Anatoliy Byshovets

Caps include those won for the Soviet Union national team.

Germany
Manager: Berti Vogts

Caps included are for the unified German national team, or its predecessor West Germany. Thomas Doll (29 caps), Andreas Thom (51) and Matthias Sammer (23) all previously won caps for East Germany in addition.

Netherlands
Manager: Rinus Michels

Scotland
Manager: Andy Roxburgh

Expelled
FR Yugoslavia was disqualified ten days before the tournament due to Yugoslav wars.

FR Yugoslavia
Manager: Ivan Čabrinović

Caps include those won for the SFR Yugoslavia national team.

References

External links
RSSSF
weltfussball.de 

1992
Squads